Rocky Point is a 40 m high headland between Horseshoe Bay and Maumee Bight, about 4 km north of Cape Royds on Ross Island, Antarctica.

Important Bird Area
A 40 ha site, comprising all the ice-free ground at the point, has been designated an Important Bird Area (IBA) by BirdLife International because it supports a breeding colony of south polar skuas, with abouty 66 breeding pairs counted in 1981.

References 

 

 

Important Bird Areas of Antarctica
Seabird colonies
Headlands of Ross Island